Zhor El Kamch (born 15 March 1973 in Tiflet) is a Moroccan female long-distance runner who competes in distance from 3000 metres up to the marathon. She represented her country at the 2000 Summer Olympics.

International competitions

Personal bests
1500 metres – 4:08.09 (1999)
3000 metres – 8:34.85 (2003)
5000 metres – 14:42.53 (2003)
10,000 metres – 33:01.29 (2001)
Half marathon – 1:11:47 (2004)
Marathon – 2:26:10 (2004)

References

External links
 
 marathoninfo

1973 births
Living people
People from Tiflet
Moroccan female long-distance runners
Moroccan female marathon runners
Olympic athletes of Morocco
Athletes (track and field) at the 2000 Summer Olympics
World Athletics Championships athletes for Morocco
Mediterranean Games gold medalists for Morocco
Mediterranean Games medalists in athletics
Athletes (track and field) at the 2005 Mediterranean Games
20th-century Moroccan women
21st-century Moroccan women